The history of the modern kilt stretches back to at least the end of the 16th century.   The kilt first appeared as the belted plaid or great kilt, a full-length garment whose upper half could be worn as a cloak draped over the shoulder, or brought up over the head as a hood. The small kilt or walking kilt (similar to the 'modern' military kilt) did not develop until the late17th or early 18th century, and is essentially the bottom half of the great kilt.

The word kilt comes from the Scots word kilt meaning to tuck up the clothes around the body, although the 11th edition of the Encyclopædia Britannica (vol. 15, p. 798) says the word is Scandinavian in origin. The Scots word derives from the Old Norse kjalta (meaning lap, fold of a gathered skirt).

The great kilt

The belted plaid or great plaid, also known as the great kilt, is likely to have evolved over the course of the 16th century from the earlier "brat" or woollen cloak (also known as a plaid) which was worn over a tunic the leine, which was also worn by the Gaelic Irish. This earlier cloak may have been plain in colour or in various check or tartan designs, depending on the wealth of the wearer; this earlier fashion of clothing had not changed significantly from that worn by Celtic warriors in Roman times.

Over the course of the 16th century, with the increasing availability of wool, the cloak had grown to such a size that it began to be gathered up and belted. This garment was gathered up into pleats and secured by a wide belt.

Plaids with belt loops were in use by the 18th century. A surviving men's belted plaid from 1822 has a belt loops sewn inside it at each pattern repeat, such that it can be unpleated entirely into a blanket, or rapidly pleated with a hidden drawstring belt (with a second belt worn outside, to flatten the pleats, as in the portrait of Lord Mungo Murray above).

The upper half could be worn as a cloak draped over the left shoulder, hung down over the belt and gathered up at the front, or brought up over the shoulders or head for protection against weather.

A description from 1746 states:

The exact age of the great kilt is still under debate. The earliest written source that definitely describes the belted plaid or great kilt comes from 1594. The great kilt is mostly associated with the Scottish Highlands, but was also used in poor Lowlands rural areas. Widespread use of this type of kilt continued into the 19th century, and some still wear it today (kiltmakers who still supply great kilts offer them primarily as highly formal attire – equivalent to white-tie evening wear – typically paired with a Sheriffmuir doublet and a ruffled jabot).

The small kilt or walking kilt

Sometime in the late 17th or early 18th century the small kilt (anglicised as filibeg or philabeg), using a single width of cloth worn hanging down below the belt came into use, becoming popular throughout the Highlands and northern Lowlands by 1746, although the great kilt or belted plaid continued to be worn.  The small kilt is a development from the great kilt, being essentially its bottom half.

A letter written by Ivan Baillie in 1768 and published in the Edinburgh Magazine in March 1785 states that the garment people would recognize as a kilt today was invented in the 1720s by Thomas Rawlinson, a Quaker from Lancashire. After the Jacobite campaign of 1715, the government opened the Highlands to outside exploitation, and Rawlinson went into partnership with Ian MacDonnell, chief of the MacDonnells of Glengarry to manufacture charcoal from the forests near Inverness and smelt iron ore there. The belted plaid worn by the Highlanders he employed was too "cumbrous and unwieldy" for this work, so, together with the tailor of the regiment stationed at Inverness, Rawlinson produced a kilt which consisted of the lower half of the belted plaid worn as a "distinct garment with pleats already sewn". He wore it himself, as did his business partner, whose clansmen then followed suit.

It has been suggested that there is evidence of Highlanders wearing only the bottom part of the belted plaid before this, possibly as early as the 1690s, but Rawlinson's is the earliest documented example with sewn-in pleats, a distinctive feature of the kilt worn today.

The tailored kilt was adopted by the Highland regiments of the British Army, and the military kilt and its formalised accessories passed into civilian usage during the early 19th century and have remained popular ever since.

The earliest extant example of a tailored kilt is from 1792 (currently in the possession of the Scottish Tartans Authority).

Proscription and revival of the kilt

A characteristic of the Highland clan system was that clansmen felt loyalty only to God, their monarch, and their Chief.  The Jacobite risings demonstrated the dangers to central government of such warrior Highland clans, and as part of a series of measures the government of King George II imposed the "Dress Act" in 1746, outlawing all items of Highland dress including kilts (although an exception was made for the Highland Regiments) with the intent of suppressing highland culture. The penalties were severe; six months' imprisonment for the first offense and seven years' transportation for the second. The ban remained in effect for 35 years.

Thus, with the exception of the Army and those who served in it, the kilt went out of use in the Scottish Highlands, but during those years it became fashionable for Scottish romantics to wear kilts as a form of protest against the ban. This was an age that romanticized "primitive" peoples, which is how Highlanders were viewed. Most Lowlanders had viewed Highlanders with fear before 1745, but many identified with them after their power was broken. The kilt, along with other features of Gaelic culture, had become identified with Jacobitism, and now that this had ceased to be a real danger it was viewed with romantic nostalgia.

Once the ban was lifted in 1782, Highland landowners set up Highland Societies with aims including "Improvements" (which others would call the Highland clearances) and promoting "the general use of the ancient Highland dress". The Celtic Society of Edinburgh, chaired by Walter Scott, encouraged lowlanders to join this antiquarian enthusiasm.

The kilt became identified with the whole of Scotland with the pageantry of the visit of King George IV to Scotland in 1822, even though 9 out of 10 Scots now lived in the Lowlands. Scott and the Highland societies organised a "gathering of the Gael" and established entirely new Scottish traditions, including Lowlanders wearing a stylised version of the traditional garment of the Highlanders. At this time many other traditions such as clan identification by tartan were developed (prior to this, tartans were identified with regions, not specific clans).

After that point the kilt gathered momentum as an emblem of Scottish culture as identified by antiquarians, romantics, and others, who spent much effort praising the "ancient" and natural qualities of the kilt. King George IV had appeared in a spectacular kilt, and his successor Queen Victoria dressed her boys in the kilt, widening its appeal. The kilt became part of the Scottish national identity and the wider Celtic identity.

Military use

From 1624 the Independent Companies of Highlanders had worn kilts as government troops, and with their formation into the Highland regiment in 1739 their great kilt uniform was standardised with a new dark tartan.

Many Jacobite rebels adopted kilts as an informal uniform, with even their English supporters wearing tartan items during the Jacobite rising of 1745. In the aftermath of that rebellion the Government decided to form more Highland regiments for the army in order to direct the energies of Gaels, that "hardy and intrepid race of men". In doing so they formed effective new army regiments to send to fight in India, North America, and other locations while lowering the possibility of rebellion at home. Army uniforms were exempt from the ban on wearing kilts in the "Dress Act", and as a means of identification the regiments were given different tartans.  These regiments opted for the modern kilts for dress uniforms, and while the great kilt remained as undress uniform this was phased out by the early 19th century.

Many Scottish units wore the kilt in combat during the First World War.  In particular, the ferocious tactics of the Black Watch led to their acquiring the nickname "Ladies from Hell" from the German troops that faced them in the trenches. The Highland regiments of the Commonwealth armies entered the Second World War wearing the kilt, but it was rapidly recognized as impractical for modern warfare, and in the first year of the war was officially banned as combat dress.  Nonetheless, individual exceptions continued, and it is believed  the kilt was last widely worn in action at the evacuation of Dunkirk in May 1940. However, on D-Day, June 1944, Lord Lovat, commander of 1 Special Service Brigade, was accompanied by his personal piper Bill Millin, who wore a kilt – and played the bagpipes – while German bullets whizzed around him.

The kerns of Gaelic Ireland wore the long léine, or "saffron shirt" (often misinterpreted as a kilt in depictions) may have had connections with the predecessor of the modern kilt. This tradition has been continued in the pipe bands of the Republic of Ireland's defence forces.

The kilt is utilized in the modern full-dress uniforms for multiple active Scottish regiments of the British Army who have some affiliation with Scotland. This includes the Royal Regiment of Scotland, Scots Guards, Royal Scots Dragoon Guards, and many other units.

Notes

References
 .
 .

External links
 Late 17th-century belted plaid
 .  Heroic and overlooked involvement in Dunkirk evacuation.
 .

Scottish clothing
History of clothing (Western fashion)
Social history of Scotland